Note: This article is about Dragsvik in Finland, not Dragsvik in Norway.

 
Dragsvik is a village in Uusimaa, Finland. It is located to the northeast of Raseborg. Dragsvik railway station and a manor house called Dragsvik gård are located there. Dragsvik is also home to the Finnish Navy marine infantry unit Nyland Brigade's garrison.

See also 
Tammisaari prison camp

References

Geography of Uusimaa
Villages in Finland